This is a list of Scottish football transfers featuring at least one 2021–22 Scottish Premiership club or one 2021–22 Scottish Championship club which were completed after the summer 2021 transfer window closed and before the end of the 2021–22 season.

List

See also
 List of Scottish football transfers summer 2021
 List of Scottish football transfers summer 2022

References

Transfers
Scottish
2022 in Scottish sport
2021 winter
2021 in Scottish sport